This is a list of electoral results for the Electoral district of Evelyn in Victorian state elections.

Members for Evelyn

Election results

Elections in the 2020s

Elections in the 2010s

Elections in the 2000s

Elections in the 1990s

Elections in the 1980s

Elections in the 1970s

Elections in the 1960s

Elections in the 1950s

Elections in the 1940s

 Preferences were not distributed.

Elections in the 1930s

 Preferences were not distributed.

 Preferences were not distributed.

Elections in the 1920s

 William Everard was the sitting Nationalist MP for Evelyn.

|- style="background-color:#E9E9E9"
! colspan="6" style="text-align:left;" |After distribution of preferences

Elections in the 1910s

 Preferences were not distributed.

References

 

Victoria (Australia) state electoral results by district